Danny Newall (1921–1997) was a Welsh professional footballer. A wing half, he progressed through the youth team at Newport County making his first team debut in 1938. He went on to make 236 appearances for Newport, scoring 4 goals between 1938 and 1955.

References

External links

1921 births
1997 deaths
Welsh footballers
Newport County A.F.C. players
English Football League players
Footballers from Newport, Wales
Association football wing halves